Metteniusa is a genus of flowering plants in the  family Metteniusaceae. It was named by Hermann Karsten in 1860 for the German botanist Georg Heinrich Mettenius. It has seven species. The type species is Metteniusa edulis.. "Metteniusaceae" was proposed by Adalbert Schnizlein and validated by Hermann Karsten in 1860.. The family is now placed in its own order, Metteniusales.

References

External links 
 Family and Suprafamilial Names At: James L. Reveal

Metteniusaceae
Asterid genera
Taxonomy articles created by Polbot